Entre el cielo y el suelo (English: Between Sky and the Ground) is an album by pop group Mecano. It was released in 1986. This was the album that established them as international artists not just in Spain, but also in the Americas, Germany, France and Italy. It was their first release with Ariola Records.  The album's title is taken from a line in "Me cuesta tanto olvidarte."

Reception

In Latin America, they started to be recognized, while in Spain they were able to stay 70 consecutive weeks in the Top 5 on the singles charts with songs like "Cruz de navajas" and "Hijo de la luna."

Track listing

Spain CD/cassette Edition
Tracks:

 English translations not official

Spain LP and USA/Latin America CD Edition
Tracks:
 Ay, qué pesado 4:02
 Ángel 4:37
 Hijo de la luna 4:22
 50 palabras, 60 palabras ó 100 4:04
 Me cuesta tanto olvidarte 2:57
 No tienes nada que perder 3:05
 Las Curvas de Esa Chica 3:14
 No es serio este cementerio 4:42
 Cruz de navajas 5:04
 Esta es la historia de un amor 3:58

France
Tracks:
 Ay, qué pesado 4:02
 Ángel 4:37
 50 palabras, 60 palabras ó 100 4:04
 Te busqué 2:55
 Me cuesta tanto olvidarte 2:57
 Héroes de la Antártida 5:09  ("Heroes from Antarctica")
 Fábula 2:05 ("Fable")
 No tienes nada que perder 3:05
 Las Curvas de Esa Chica 3:14
 No es serio este cementerio 4:42
 Las cosas pares 2:25
 Esta es la historia de un amor 3:58
 Hermano sol hermana luna 3:33 ("Brother sun, sister moon")
 Laika 4:37

2005 re-release
Tracks:
 Ay, qué pesado 4:02
 Ángel 4:37
 Hijo de la luna 4:22
 50 palabras, 60 palabras ó 100 4:04
 Te busqué 2:55
 Me cuesta tanto olvidarte 2:57
 No tienes nada que perder 3:05
 Las curvas de esa chica 3:14
 No es serio este cementerio 4:42
 Cruz de navajas 5:04
 Las cosas pares 2:25
 Ésta es la historia de un amor 3:58
 Canción cortita para antes que nos abandone el mar 1:00 ("A quick song for time, before the sea abandons us") 
 Figlio della luna  4:22 (Italian rendition of "Hijo de la luna")

Charts

Album charts

Single charts
 Ay qué pesado
 Baila con Mecano (Maxi-single, special edition for Clubs, 7 July 1986)
 Cruz de navajas
 Me cuesta tanto olvidarte
 No es serio este cementerio
 Hijo de la luna

References

1986 albums
Mecano albums